The Senate of Virginia is the upper house of the Virginia General Assembly. The Senate is composed of 40 senators representing an equal number of single-member constituent districts. The Senate is presided over by the lieutenant governor of Virginia. Prior to the American War of Independence, the upper house of the General Assembly was represented by the Virginia Governor's Council, consisting of up to 12 executive counselors appointed by the colonial royal governor as advisers and jurists.

The lieutenant governor presides daily over the Virginia Senate. In the lieutenant governor's absence, the president pro tempore presides, usually a powerful member of the majority party. The Senate is equal with the House of Delegates, the lower chamber of the legislature, except that taxation bills must originate in the House, similar to the federal U.S. Congress. The 40 senatorial districts in Virginia elect their representatives every four years on the Tuesday following the first Monday in November. The last election took place in November 2019. There are no term limits for senators. The Senate also employs 36 pages (ages 13–14) to help with daily tasks during each general session in a full-time residential program of high regard.

History
The Senate of Virginia was created by the 1776 Constitution of Virginia, and originally consisted of twenty-four members. Along with the House of Delegates, the Senate comprised a new bicameral legislature designed to replace the colonial Virginia House of Burgesses, which formally dissolved on May 6, 1776. The Senate replaced the legislative functions of the appointed Virginia Council of State.

Pursuant to the original Virginia Constitution, the Senate was only permitted to file amendments, while the House of Delegates had the power to propose bills. Accordingly, the Senate had far less power than the House, until the revised Virginia constitution of 1851 allowed the Senate to propose new laws.

In the 2007 elections, the Democratic Party reclaimed the majority in the Senate for the first time since 1995, when the Republican Party gained a 20–20 split. The Republicans took control of the Senate for the first time in history after a January 1998 special election. The 2011 elections resulted in a 20–20 split between the parties, but as the tie breaker was Republican lieutenant governor Bill Bolling, the Republicans effectively regained control.

After the 2013 elections, Democratic state senator Ralph Northam became the lieutenant governor, but the Democrats did not regain control of the chamber until January 28, 2014, following a series of special elections including that of Northam's vacated 6th district seat. The Democratic majority would prove short-lived, however, as Senator Phil Puckett (D-38th) resigned, effective June 8, handing the GOP a majority of 20 to 19. The Republicans solidified their majority following a special election win on August 19, 2014, which increased their total number of seats to 21.

The Democratic Party regained control of Senate after the 2019 election and new members were sworn into office on January 8, 2020. As the legislative session opened, Louise Lucas was elected as the first female and African-American President Pro Tempore.

Salary and qualifications
The annual salary for senators is $18,000 per year. To qualify for office, senators must be at least 21 years of age at the time of the election, residents of the district they represent, and qualified to vote for General Assembly legislators. The regular session of the General Assembly is 60 days long during even numbered years and 30 days long during odd numbered years, unless extended by a two-thirds vote of both houses.

Composition

Historical composition

Current session

Leadership

Committee chairs and ranking members
The Senate of Virginia has 10 Standing Committees and a Committee on Rules.

Members

District map

Senate seal 
The Senate of Virginia has its own coat of arms designed and granted by the College of Arms in England.  The coat of arms also makes up the official seal of the Virginia Senate. It bears no resemblance to the Seal of the Commonwealth of Virginia, which is the seal of the state as a whole.

The coat of arms adopted January 22, 1981, was designed by the College of Arms and based on the coat of arms used by the London Company, the royally-chartered English entrepreneurs who funded the European settlement of Virginia. This is not to be confused with the Seal of the London Company, for other than both devices displaying a quartered shield, there is little resemblance between them.

The Senate's arms have a shield in the center which is divided into four sections by a red cross. In each quarter are smaller shields representing the arms of four countries (England, France, Scotland, and Ireland) that contributed settlers to Virginia's early waves of European immigration.

The four coats of arms, a small crest of a crowned female head with unbound hair representing Queen Elizabeth (the Virgin Queen who named Virginia, and the dragon (part of the Elizabethan royal seal of England) represent Virginia's European heritage.

An ivory gavel emblazoned on the vertical arm of the red cross represents the Senate as a law making body. The cardinal and dogwood depicted are Virginia's official state bird and tree. The ribbon contains the Latin motto of the Senate, Floreat Senatus Virginiae, which means "May the Senate of Virginia flourish."

Past composition of the Senate

See also
 List of Virginia state legislatures

Notes

References

External links
Virginia General Assembly official government website

 Includes a very small version of the Seal of the Senate of the Commonwealth of Virginia

Virginia General Assembly
Virginia Senate